Dorsal digital arteries may refer to:

 Dorsal digital arteries of hand
 Dorsal digital arteries of foot